Krasnooktyabrsky (masculine), Krasnooktyabrskaya (feminine), or Krasnooktyabrskoye (neuter) is the name of several inhabited localities in Russia.

Modern localities
Urban localities
Krasnooktyabrsky, Mari El Republic, an urban-type settlement in Medvedevsky District, Mari El Republic

Rural localities
Krasnooktyabrsky, Republic of Adygea, a settlement in Maykopsky District of the Republic of Adygea
Krasnooktyabrsky, Chelyabinsk Oblast, a settlement in Rodnikovsky Selsoviet of Troitsky District of Chelyabinsk Oblast
Krasnooktyabrsky, Kirov Oblast, a settlement in Vozhgalsky Rural Okrug of Kumyonsky District of Kirov Oblast
Krasnooktyabrsky, Kursk Oblast, a settlement in Veselovsky Selsoviet of Glushkovsky District of Kursk Oblast
Krasnooktyabrsky, Orenburg Oblast, a settlement in Krasnooktyabrsky Selsoviet of Oktyabrsky District of Orenburg Oblast
Krasnooktyabrsky, Penza Oblast, a settlement in Luninsky Selsoviet of Luninsky District of Penza Oblast
Krasnooktyabrsky, Samara Oblast, a settlement in Bolshechernigovsky District of Samara Oblast
Krasnooktyabrsky, Stavropol Krai, a settlement in Shturmovsky Selsoviet of Krasnogvardeysky District of Stavropol Krai
Krasnooktyabrskoye, Republic of Dagestan, a selo in Novokokhanovsky Selsoviet of Kizlyarsky District of the Republic of Dagestan
Krasnooktyabrskoye, Kaliningrad Oblast, a settlement in Kamensky Rural Okrug of Chernyakhovsky District of Kaliningrad Oblast
Krasnooktyabrskoye, Kursk Oblast, a selo in Snagostsky Selsoviet of Korenevsky District of Kursk Oblast

Historical localities
Krasnooktyabrsky, Volgograd Oblast, formerly a work settlement under the administrative jurisdiction of the city of oblast significance of Volzhsky, Volgograd Oblast; merged into Volzhsky in April 2012

See also
Krasny Oktyabr (disambiguation)